In genomics, DNA–DNA hybridization is a molecular biology technique that measures the degree of genetic similarity between pools of DNA sequences. It is usually used to determine the genetic distance between two organisms and has been used extensively in phylogeny and taxonomy.

Method 

The DNA of one organism is labelled, then mixed with the unlabelled DNA to be compared against. The mixture is incubated to allow DNA strands to dissociate and then cooled to form renewed hybrid double-stranded DNA. Hybridized sequences with a high degree of similarity will bind more firmly, and require more energy to separate them: i.e. they separate when heated at a higher temperature than dissimilar sequences, a process known as "DNA melting".

To assess the melting profile of the hybridized DNA, the double-stranded DNA is bound to a column or filter and the mixture is heated in small steps. At each step, the column or filter is washed; sequences that melt become single-stranded and wash off. The temperatures at which labelled DNA comes off reflects the amount of similarity between sequences (and the self-hybridization sample serves as a control). These results are combined to determine the degree of genetic similarity between organisms.

One method was introduced for hybridizing large numbers of DNA samples against large numbers of DNA probes on a single membrane.  These samples would have to be separated in their own lanes inside the membranes and then the membrane would have to be rotated to a different angle where it would result in simultaneous hybridization with many different DNA probes.

Uses

When several species are compared, similarity values allow organisms to be arranged in a phylogenetic tree; it is therefore one possible approach to carrying out molecular systematics.

In microbiology
DNA-DNA hybridization (DDH) is used as a primary method to distinguish bacterial species as it is difficult to visually classify them accurately. This technique is not widely used on larger organisms where differences in species are easier to identify. In the late 1900's, strains were considered to belong to the same species if they had a DNA-DNA similarity value greater than 70% and their melting temperatures were within 5°C of each other. In 2014, a threshold of 79% similarity has been suggested to separate bacterial subspecies. 

DDH is a common technique for bacteria, but it is labor intensive, error-prone, and technically challenging. In 2004, a new DDH technique was described. This technique utilized microplates and colorimetrically labelled DNA to decrease the time needed and increase the amount of samples that can be processed. This new DDH technique became the standard for bacterial taxonomy.

In zoology
Charles Sibley and Jon Ahlquist, pioneers of the technique, used DNA–DNA hybridization to examine the phylogenetic relationships of avians (the Sibley–Ahlquist taxonomy) and primates.

In radioactivity 
In 1969, one such method was performed by Mary Lou Pardue and Joseph G. Gall at the Yale University through radioactivity where it involved the hybridization of a radioactive test DNA in solution to the stationary DNA of a cytological preparation, which is identified as autoradiography.

Replacement by genome sequencing 

Critics argue that the technique is inaccurate for comparison of closely related species, as any attempt to measure differences between orthologous sequences between organisms is overwhelmed by the hybridization of paralogous sequences within an organism's genome. DNA sequencing and computational comparisons of sequences is now generally the method for determining genetic distance, although the technique is still used in microbiology to help identify bacteria.

In silico methods

The modern approach is to carry out DNA–DNA hybridization in silico utilizes completely or partially sequenced genomes. The GGDC and TYGS developed at DSMZ are the most accurate known tools for calculating DDH-analogous values. Among other algorithmic improvements, it solves the problem with paralogous sequences by carefully filtering them from the matches between the two genome sequences.

See also
 DNA melting
 Temperature gradient gel electrophoresis

References

Further reading
 Graur, D. & Li, W-H. 1991 (2nd ed. 1999). Fundamentals of Molecular Evolution.

Molecular biology
DNA